The Ambassadors of Harmony (AOH) is a 120+ member men's barbershop chorus, based in St. Charles, Missouri. The chorus won International Championship gold medals in 2004, 2009, and 2012 – each time singing two arrangements by David Wright, under the direction of Dr. Jim Henry – and then again in 2016, under the co-direction of Jonny Moroni and Dr. Henry. Their 2009 victory broke a nearly three-decade winning streak by the Vocal Majority.

Noted for its crisp choreography and its broad demographics, the chorus continues to expand its reputation as a premier arts organization while expanding audience engagement. Their Christmas shows are among the most popular holiday concerts in St. Louis, averaging over 7,000 patrons per year, while their youth programs continue to expand and equip young singers in substantive ways. The chorus has established a foundation to ensure that its mission to youth will continue to deepen, and as of 2017 it added an annual fundraising gala to its calendar to engage the community to join in their goals.

History
The chorus was formed in 1963 as the Daniel Boone Chorus with 26 members, and became a member of SPEBSQSA (the Society for the Preservation and Encouragement of Barbershop Quartet Singing in America) the following year. The chorus changed its name to the Ambassadors of Harmony in 1990 following its first international competition. The chorus was directed by noted arranger and mathematician David Wright (now assistant director) from 1981 to 1990 and again in 1999 to 2000 and has been directed from 1991 to 1999 and since 2001 by Dr. Jim Henry (now co-director), bass singer of the 1993 International Quartet Champion, The Gas House Gang, and the 2009 International Quartet Champion, Crossroads. Since 2013, the group's co-director has been Jonny Moroni, baritone of Vocal Spectrum, the BHS 2006 International Quartet Champion and 2004 International College Quartet Champion.

Barbershop Harmony Society medalists

Since 1994, the Ambassadors of Harmony Chorus has won top honors in every district chorus competition they have entered for the 5-state Central States District of the Barbershop Harmony Society (formerly known as SPEBSQSA, Inc). In this period the AOH acquired four 4th place, five 3rd place, and five 2nd place medals in international chorus competition, as well as the 2004, 2009, 2012, and 2016 gold medals.

At the BHS international chorus contest in July 2007, the group tied for first place with the Westminster Chorus. The winner was then determined by the singing category score, earning AOH its first silver medal. The group won another silver medal in the July 2008 international contest in Nashville, Tennessee, then won their second gold medal in July 2009 in Anaheim, California. Their third gold medal was won in 2012 in Portland, Oregon. Their fourth gold medal was won in 2016 in Nashville, Tennessee.

St. Louis Area activity

Municipal Opera performances

St Louis Muny performances include:

Oklahoma! 1993, with members of the Riverblenders Chorus (SAI)
50 members in the 2000 cast of White Christmas
25 members in the 2006 cast of White Christmas
25 members in the 1992, 1997, and 2003 casts of South Pacific
Quartets supplied for The Music Man and other productions

Other performances

Youth Activities
 Acappellooza Fall – Begun in 2002, in partnership with the University of Missouri St. Louis, the program provides an opportunity for 1,100 high school students to take a day trip to work with director Dr. Jim Henry, be mentored by and hear a set by AOH.
 College Scholarship – ongoing since at least 1997, provides a scholarship for a male high-schooler from St. Charles County, and since 2016 expanded to include St. Louis and St. Louis County
 Recruits Chorus – Formed in 2012, it is a mixed chorus for youth aged 9–25. The Recruits is co-directed by AOH directors Dr. Jim Henry and Jonny Moroni; they have competed in the BHS MidWinter contest.
 Acappellooza Summer – Since 2013, a four-day camp on the campus of UMSL, led by Dr. Jim Henry, teaching barbershop and a cappella singing
 Project Harmony St. Louis – Ambassadors encourage and mentor students at local high schools in barbershop quartetting
 AcaFest – The newest outreach, since 2016, an October gathering of local high school and college a cappella groups to form stronger relationships with the youth a cappella community. The first event took place on the campus of Missouri Baptist University.

International performances
Several international affiliate organizations of the Barbershop Harmony Society have invited AOH to perform at their gatherings.
 Spring 1999 Ireland
 March 2004 Germany (BinG! Convention), Netherlands, and Sweden (with The EntertainMen)
 May 2006 England BABS Convention
 March 2016 Germany (BinG! Convention)

Discography
All Our Best 1994 [sold out]
Sing, Sing, Sing! 2000
Applause! 2002
Holidays in Gold December 2004
Oh What a Day! June 2010
Welcome Christmas! December 2011
Somewhere 2013
On Top Of The World 2016

Selection of songs list
Some of AOH's more popular songs, and their years in repertoire, are:

Awards and recognition
 St Charles County Arty Award – Arts Council, 1996
 Most Creative Choral Ensemble (Reader's Pick) – St. Louis Post-Dispatch, 2015
Excellence in the arts honoree – St. Louis Arts and Education Council, 2020

Notes

References

External links and sources
Official website
Barbershop Harmony Society International Score Sheets
AOH newsletters ("Break Time")

Barbershop Harmony Society choruses
American choirs
Professional a cappella groups
Musical groups established in 1963
1963 establishments in Missouri